Carphephorus bellidifolius, the sandy-woods chaffhead, is a species of North American plants in the family Asteraceae. They are native to the southeastern United States in the States of Virginia, Georgia, North Carolina, and South Carolina.

Carphephorus bellidifolius  is an herb up to 60 cm (24 inches) tall, largely without hairs. It produces an open, loose inflorescence with many small purplish flower heads containing disc florets but no ray florets.

References

External links
North Carolina Native Plant Society
Southeastern Flora
Carolina Nature
Digital Atlas of the Virginia Flora

Eupatorieae
Plants described in 1803
Flora of the Southeastern United States
Flora without expected TNC conservation status